Rovasenda is a comune (municipality) in the Province of Vercelli in the Italian region Piedmont, located about  northeast of Turin and about  northwest of Vercelli.

Rovasenda borders the following municipalities: Arborio, Brusnengo, Buronzo, Gattinara, Ghislarengo, Lenta, Masserano, Roasio, and San Giacomo Vercellese.

Geography 

The territory of the comune of Rovasenda is enclosed in the alta pianura vercellese (high plain of Vercelli, also known as Baraggia). The land is levelled, with a slight inclination from north to the south.
Its altitude varies from 259 to 199 m above sea level.; the Comune is about 9 km from north to south and 5 km from east to west.
It borders Roasio e Gattinara to the north, Lenta, Ghislarengo e Arborio to the east, San Giacomo Vercellese and Buronzo to the south and Masserano and Brusnengo to the west, which form part of the province of Biella.
The comune's territory comprises the Rovasenda stream as well as the Marchiazza stream, which marks part of its eastern boundary. Numerous irrigation canals supply the surrounding rice paddies with water; among these, the Roggia del Marchese (also known as Roggia Marchionale) is the most noteworthy.
Most of the settlements are found within the main administrative division (capoluogo), surrounded by vast rice fields speckled with sparse, secluded farmhouses; aside from the capoluogo there are no divisions of relevant size.
Rovasenda is located at the crossroads of two railway lines (the Santhià-Arona railway and the Biella-Novara railway) by which it can be accessed; oddly enough the town has two separate yet adjacent railway stations (the Rovasenda and Rovasenda Alta railway stations, on the Biella-Novara and the Santhià-Arona railway lines respectively).

Demographic evolution

See also 
 Rovasenda (stream)

References

External links
 www.comune.rovasenda.vc.it/

 
Cities and towns in Piedmont